Jawaani Jaaneman is a 2020 Indian Hindi-language comedy-drama film directed by Nitin Kakkar and produced by Saif Ali Khan, Jackky Bhagnani, Deepshikha Deshmukh and Jay Shewakramani under Pooja Entertainment, Black Knight Films and Northern Lights Films. A remake of the 2010 Argentine comedy Igualita a mí, the film stars Khan and debutante Alaya Furniturewala in the lead roles and explores the story of Jazz, a property broker and party-animal in London, who has to confront a daughter he never knew he had, who is also pregnant. Guest-starring Tabu, it was released theatrically in India on 31 January 2020 to positive response from the critics.

Plot

Jaswinder "Jazz" Singh (Saif Ali Khan) is a 40-year-old carefree womaniser who works in London as a property broker during the day with his brother Dimpy (Kumud Mishra) and parties at night in a bar owned by his friend Rajendra "Rocky" Sharma (Chunky Pandey), usually taking whichever girl agrees to go to his home for a one-night stand. Jazz, along with his brother Dimpy, has to negotiate a multi-million-pound deal involving a property in Hounslow, but his aged landlady Mallika (Kamlesh Gill) refuses to part with her home due to an old tree, and his repeated attempts to convince her to give it up for the new construction do not succeed.

One night, Jazz is partying as usual when a girl spills her drink on him; she apologises and he carries on. The next night, at the bar, she reveals herself to him as Tia (Alaya F), a 21-year-old Amsterdammer who has come to London for some personal work, as she puts it. He agrees to take her to his home. There, Jazz learns from her that he is one of three possible options for her father, based on a photograph of Tia's mother with him. When she tells him that she might be his daughter, he is aghast, but she advises him to take a DNA test to confirm the results. When the results arrive, it transpires that not only is Tia Jazz's daughter, but she also happens to be pregnant.
A shocked Jazz initially refuses to accept the truth; when Tia offers to stay with him and deliver her baby at his home, he refuses, saying that he cannot take on the responsibility of running a family. She moves in next door to his house. He consults his hairdresser friend Rhea (Kubbra Sait), who is his age, for advice. She congratulates him and advises him to confront his being not only a father but also an impending grandfather. His reckless partying ways continue at personal expense, as once he falls from a bar table, drunk, and breaks his leg. His feelings for Rhea grow, but when he tries to make a sexual advance, she stops him and asks him to restrain himself from ruining their friendship.
Meanwhile, Tia visits Jazz at his home regularly, and silently resolves to endear herself to his family. One night Jazz's brother Dimpy and their parents visit his home. Despite Jazz warning her against it, Tia embraces everyone, and catches them unawares when she shows them her sonogram on Jazz's projector, forcing him to explain the situation. Jazz realizes after a conversation with Dimpy that he actually should take care of Tia, and the father-daughter duo reconciles.
The two happily live through her pregnancy, until one day when Tia's hippie mother Ananya (Tabu) and Tia's boyfriend Rohan turn up from Amsterdam unannounced. Ananya and Rohan's hippie, drug-fuelled, wanton ways are too much for Jazz to handle, and he fears that this may impact Tia's delivery. Hurt by the final model of the construction in which the old tree is missing, she leaves; when Jazz confronts her, and attempts to convince her that the millions to be gained from the property will more than compensate for the lost tree, she tells him tearfully that he can't be her father, having not even an iota of emotion and attachment within himself.

A despondent Jazz ponders over whether the deal is really worth aggrieving an old lady, before he finally decides to call off the Hounslow project, even at the expense of money, to which Dimpy agrees. He then rushes to the Waterloo railway station where the three are waiting for their train; he proceeds to tell how he cancelled the deal and saved Mallika's tree, when Tia's water breaks suddenly.

The film ends with Rhea and Rocky joining the Singh family at Jazz's parents' home for Diwali celebrations. Jazz whispers into baby Kiara's ears that she will be the world's first baby to witness the wedding of both her parents and her grandfather, as Tia looks on happily.

Cast
 Saif Ali Khan as Jaswinder "Jazz" Singh, Tia's father and Ananya's ex-boyfriend.
 Tabu as Ananya Singh, Tia's mother and Jazz's ex-girlfriend
 Alaya F as Tia Singh, Jazz and Ananya's daughter and Rohan's girlfriend 
 Kubbra Sait as Rhea, Jazz's bestfriend and hair stylist.
 Chunky Pandey as Rajendra "Rocky" Sharma, Jazz's Best Friend
 Kumud Mishra as Dimpy Singh, Jazz's elder brother
 Farida Jalal as Jazz's mother
 Shavinder Mahal as Jazz's father
 Kamlesh Gill as Mrs. Mallika
 Dante Alexander as Rohan , Tia's boyfriend
 Kiku Sharda as Dr. Kriplani
 Rameet Sandhu as Tanvi
 Diljohn Singh as Grover, Jazz's Client
 Tea Wagner as Kiara

Production

Development
Saif Ali Khan started a new production houses laa in October 2018 to co-produce Jawaani Jaaneman with Jay Shewakramani. Saif wanted the avant-garde project  in an alternative genre. In a statement, he said, "this is going to be as exciting as it gets. Jay and I have been planning this for a while now and with Jawaani Jaaneman, we found just the right project to produce together.” Alaya F, daughter of actress Pooja Bedi, making her debut is playing the role of his daughter. Tabu has been cast in an extended cameo role. Khan lost weight to fit into the character of a 40-year-old father.

Filming
The filming began in the second week of June 2019 with principal photography in London. Alaya finished the filming of the first schedule in August 2019. The film was eventually wrapped up on 24 August 2019.

Release
The film was released on 31 January 2020

Box office 
Jawaani Jaaneman earned 3.24 crore at the domestic box-office on its opening day. On the second day, the film collected ₹4.55 crore. On the third day, the film collected ₹5.04 crore, taking its total opening weekend collection to ₹12.83 crore.

, with a gross of 34.50 crore in India and 10.27 crore overseas, the film has a worldwide gross collection of 44.77 crore.

Soundtrack

This film’s soundtrack is composed by Gourov-Roshin, Tanishk Bagchi and Prem-Hardeep. The lyrics are written by Preet Harpal, Mumzy Stranger, Shabbir Ahmed, Devshi Khanduri and Shellee.

The song Gallan Kardi is a remake of the song Dil Luteya, written by Preet Harpal, composed by Sukshinder Shinda and sung by Jazzy B and Apache Indian.

The song "Ole Ole 2.0" from Yeh Dillagi (1994) was originally composed by Dilip Sen and Sameer Sen, with lyrics by Sameer Anjaan and sung by Abhijeet Bhattacharya and was recreated by Tanishk Bagchi with Shabbir Ahmed penning the revamped lyrics.

Awards and nominations

References

External links
 
 

2020s Hindi-language films
Films shot in London
Indian comedy-drama films
Remakes of Argentine films
2020 comedy-drama films
Indian pregnancy films